Giuseppe Oronzo Giannuzzi (March 16, 1838, Altamura, Italy – March 8, 1876, Siena, Italy) was an Italian physiologist.

His most important discovery is one of the serous demilunes, or crescents: cellular formations that are on some submaxillary salivary glands.

After graduating in medicine in Pisa in 1861, he studied at Claude Bernard's laboratory in Paris. In 1864 he moved to Berlin in the school of Rudolf Virchow under the leadership of Wilhelm Kühne. He was also at Carl Ludwig's laboratory in Leipzig. In 1867 he became professor of Physiology at the University of Siena where he carried out original research.

He founded the "Rivista Scientifica" and he was the director.

References

V. Busacchi, Il fisiologo G. Giannuzzi (1839-1876) e la sua opera, Altamura / Rivista Storica / Bollettino dell'Archivio - Biblioteca - Museo Civico, N. 17/18 - Gennaio 1975/1976, pp. 57–88
V. Chierico, Elogio funebre del Cav. Giuseppe Giannuzzi, Professore di Fisiologia all'Università di Siena, Conti, Matera (1876)
C. Ricci, "Giuseppe Giannuzzi, lo scopritore delle lunule", in C. Ricci and G. Carissimo, La Triade Scientifica Altamurana, Quaderni dell'A.T.A. Pro Loco Altamura, 2 (1988), pp. 7–29

External links 
 Monuments and memories of Giuseppe Oronzo Giannuzzi in Himetop - The History of Medicine Topographical Database

People from Altamura
1838 births
1876 deaths
Academic staff of the University of Siena
Italian physiologists